Edward Julius Detmold (21 November 1883 Putney, Wandsworth, Surrey - 1 July 1957 Montgomery) and his twin brother Charles Maurice Detmold (1883-1908) were prolific Victorian and early twentieth century book illustrators.

Biography and works
Their parents were Edward Detmold and Mary Agnes Luck. Their father, an electrical engineer was absent for much of their childhood, and they lived with their uncle and guardian, Dr Edward Barton Shuldham, who saw to their tuition and was a noted collector of porcelain and Japanese woodblock prints of plants and animals. Dr Shuldham occupied a house in Upper Richmond Road, Putney, where the twins had been born. He ensured their interest in natural history and art, and created a nurturing environment for their precocious talents. They also spent time with another uncle, the painter Henry E. Detmold, who encouraged them in their art. Most of their prodigious energy was expended on depicting animal subjects and their work showed great influence from traditional Japanese art, Albrecht Dürer and later the Art Nouveau movement. They were exhibiting watercolours at the Royal Academy and the Royal Institute of Painters in Water Colours at the age of 13. Edward Burne-Jones praised their work and warned against the dangers of uniformity inherent in art schools.

The twins subsequently mastered the techniques of watercolour etching and of colour printing with copper plates, buying a printing press and producing their own proofs at home.

In 1898 they compiled a portfolio of colour etchings of animals and flowering plants done in the Japanese style. These were much sought after and were rapidly sold out. They collaborated on the etchings and illustrations for their first book Pictures From Birdland published in 1899. This book resulted from a number of drawings being shown in the autumn of 1897, to the publisher J. M. Dent, who was so impressed that the two brothers were asked to provide coloured illustrations for a book of his. The first title mooted was Alphabet of Birds, eventually becoming Pictures from Birdland. "Particularly noticeable are the early influences in the paintings, Edward's design for an osprey, with its unusual water effects, testifying to a Japanese contribution. Already apparent is that style in which a searching study of natural forms, especially bird plumage, is subordinated to decorative arrangement" - David Larkin (The Fantastic Creatures of Edward Julius Detmold) This was followed in 1900, by an exhibition at the Fine Art Society's Gallery in London.

Their next joint project was to produce a set of 16 watercolours for Rudyard Kipling's The Jungle Book published in 1903, by Macmillan. The success of their painting careers seemed assured, but Maurice ended his life by inhaling chloroform in April 1908, shortly before they were due to leave for a holiday in Sussex with Dr Shuldham, who had arranged that Maurice put down the household cats using the anaesthetic. Although stunned by the death of Maurice, Edward threw himself into his work.

The recognition accorded the twins' illustrations of Kipling's classic tale was extraordinary. Consequently, in 1909 Edward illustrated The Fables of Aesop, producing 23 colour plates and a host of pen & ink drawings. This proved so popular that in 2006 The Folio Society of London published a facsimile of the original Hodder & Stoughton edition.

In 1911, Detmold worked on illustrations for Maurice Maeterlinck's The Life of the Bee, Camille Lemonnier's Birds and Beasts and Florence Dugdale's Book of Baby Beasts. In the following year he worked on Maeterlinck's Hours of Gladness, in 1913, on Florence Dugdale's Book of Baby Birds and in 1919, on W. H. Hudson's Birds in Town and Village. During the First World War, Edward Detmold sought recognition as a conscientious objector, but this was denied by the official tribunal, and he was forcibly enrolled in a training unit attached to the Middlesex Regiment. In 1919, he also produced a portfolio of Twenty Four Nature Pictures and, in 1921, illustrated Our Little Neighbours and Jean-Henri Fabre's Book of Insects. 
Edward took up etching again in 1922 after Campbell Dodgson praised the Detmolds' work in The Print Collector's Quarterly.

1923 saw the appearance of Rainbow Houses. In 1924, Hodder & Stoughton published The Arabian Nights - Tales from the Thousand and One Nights, a book that had been planned from before Maurice's death. Again, an enduring interest in the book and particularly its illustrations, led to a 2003 facsimile edition from The Folio Society. Edward Detmold was painstaking in his work, missing deadlines so that a complete set of colour plates for Hans Christian Andersen's Fairy Tales were never used by Hodder and remained unpublished. Detmold's meticulously finished images compare favourably with work by any of the Pre-Raphaelites.

Edward Julius became one of the most talented of illustrators, depicting animals and plants with an extraordinary understanding, and making use of fantasy settings of architecture and landscape. He also published three short unillustrated works (two of them issued anonymously), expressing his spiritual beliefs, and in the 1930s created a series of anti-war paintings with accompanying text, entitled "The Truth", which were never published. He lived in London, sharing a house with his mother, artist Sidney Laurence Biddle and musician Harold Hulls, until the outbreak of the Second World War, when the household moved first to Sussex and then to Montgomeryshire, and in his final years he retired completely from public life. He suffered a period of depression, brought on by failing eyesight, that resulted in his committing suicide, aged 73, by his shooting himself in the chest in July 1957.

References

Sources
Alfrey, N., and R. Verdi, Charles Maurice (1883–1908) and Edward Julius Detmold (1883–1957): A Centenary Exhibition, exh. cat., Universities of York and Nottingham and Natural History Museum, London: York, 1983.
Dalby, R. The Illustrated Books of Maurice and Edward Detmold, Book and Magazine Collector, vol. 42, pp. 23–31.
Dodgson, C., Maurice and Edward Detmold, Print Collector’s Quarterly, vol.9, 1922, pp. 373–405 (originally publ. in Die Graphischen Künste, 33, Vienna, 1910, pp. 17–24).
Dodgson, C., Detmold, (Charles) Maurice (1883–1908), Rev. C. Serhan, ODNB, Oxford, 2004.
Engen, R., The Age of Enchantment: Beardsley, Dulac and their Contemporaries 1890–1930, exh. cat., Dulwich Picture Gallery, London, 2007.
Lago, M., ed., Burne-Jones Talking, London, 1982.
McPhail, I. The Art of Edward Julius Detmold, Folio, Autumn 1994, pp. 17–24.
Morris-Suzuki, T. In Search of the Lost Artist: Edward Julius Detmold (1883-1957), documentary video series, 2022.
Spielmann, M.H., Two Boys – Maurice and Edward Detmold, Magazine of Art Volume 24 Issue 3 January 1900, pp. 112–18.
David Larkin The Fantastic Creatures of Edward Julius Detmold, Peacock Press/Bantam Books 1976

Gallery

External links

 
 
Gallery of images from "Hours of Gladness"
Biography and gallery
Books and Covers
Images
Gallery of Images
Sixteen illustrations of subjects from Kipling's "Jungle book" by Maurice & Edward Detmold. From the Rudyard Kipling Collections at the Library of Congress
Biography of the brothers

English illustrators
1883 births
1957 deaths
Artists from London
Art Nouveau illustrators
Natural history illustrators
1957 suicides
Suicides by firearm in Wales